Central Ojibwa (also known as Central Ojibwe, Ojibway, Ojibwe) is an Algonquian language spoken in Ontario, Canada from Lake Nipigon in the west to Lake Nipissing in the east.

Phonology

Vowels

Diphthongs

Consonants

See also
 Ojibwe dialects

Notes

External links
OLAC resources in and about the Central Ojibwa language

Central Algonquian languages
Ojibwa language, Central
Indigenous languages of the North American eastern woodlands
First Nations languages in Canada